Saraorci  is a village in the municipality of Smederevo, Serbia. According to the 2002 census, the village has a population of 2413 people. The manager  and politician Zoran Janković was born in Saraorci.

References

Populated places in Podunavlje District